"When the Angels Sing" is a song recorded by German pop group No Angels. It was written by Peter Ries and Charlemaine Thomas-Schmidtner and produced by the former for the band's debut studio album, Elle'ments (2001). A midtempo pop ballad, "When the Angels Sind" features a cascading piano arrangement and dominant drum pattern. Lyrically, it finds the group, as the protagonists, thinking deeply over their relationship with their love interests from whom they parted, still pining for them.

A slightly remixed version of the song was picked as the album's fourth and final single on a double A-side with a cover version of Donovan's 1968 song "Atlantis", the theme song for Walt Disney's animated feature Atlantis: The Lost Empire (2001). Released on November 19, 2001 in German-speaking Europe, the single peaked at number five on the Austrian and German Singles Chart, also reaching number 16 in Switzerland. The music video for "When the Angels Sing" features one of the group's live performances of the song during their Rivers of Joy Tour in fall 2001, intercut by backstage footage of the band.

Background 
"When the Angels Sing" was written by frequent No Angels collaborator, German musician Peter Ries, and American-born singer-songwriter Charlemaine Thomas-Schmidtner. Ries also oversaw production for Cheyenne Media. All music was recorded and mixed by Ries at D-2-P Studios in New York City, New York. Mike "Spike" Streefkerk, Trevor Hurst and their assistant recording engineer Stuart Jones assisted him with the recording of the vocals at the Park Studios in Tutzing at Lake Starnberg, while Popstars coach Robert Bicknell served as the vocal coach during recording. Ossi Schaller played the guitar, with Ulf Zwerger assisting in its audio engineering, while Dirk Kurock and Trevor Hurst served as Pro Tools editors.

The mid-tempo ballad was the third song that the newly formed band recorded for their debut album Elle'ments. As tracked during the final episodes of Popstars, Ries initially planned to have Nadja Benaissa sing both verses, with Vanessa Petruo leading both bridges. His plans were not well received within the remaining members of the band who felt that their absence on "When the Angels Sing" ignored their wishes to share lead vocals on all songs and displayed them as backing singers. Ries eventually revised the song, resulting in Petruo and Lucy Diakovska singing the first verse and Benaissa and Sandy Mölling sharing vocals during the second verse. Mölling also took over the first bridge from Petruo, while the second bridge was split between Petruo and Jessica Wahls.

Release and reception 
"When the Angels Sing" was one tracks the group performed at their first official press conference at the Parkcafé in Munich on January 9, 2001. It was eventually selected as the album's fourth and final single along with group's collaboration with Scottish singer Donovan on their rendition of his 1968 song "Atlantis", the theme song for Walt Disney's animated feature Atlantis: The Lost Empire (2001). Physical CD singles of the double-A single were released on November 19, 2001 by Cheyenne Records. The maxi single includes three new remixes of the song, including a remixed single version, and two versions of the "Atlantis" song.

Upon its release, "When the Angels Sing"/"Atlantis" debuted at number five on the German Singles Chart in the week of December 3, 2001. It spent six weeks within the top ten and fell out of the chart in the 14th weeks, becoming the 79th highest-selling single of 2001 in Germany. In Austria, the double-A single debuted at number ten on the Ö3 Austria Top 40. It peaked at number five in its third week and spent four more weeks within the top ten, leaving the top 75 after 14 weeks. In Switzerland, "When the Angels Sing"/"Atlantis" entered the Swiss Hitparade at number 56 in the week of December 2. It reached its peak, number 16, in its second week, becoming the band's first single to miss the top ten. It fell out of the top 100 after twelve weeks on the chart.

Music video
The accompanying music video for "When the Angels Sing" was directed by Stefan Klotz for DoRo Productions. It features one of the group's live performances of the song during their Rivers of Joy Tour in fall 2001, intercut by backstage footage of the band.

Cover versions
In 2003, "When the Angels Sing" along with "Come Back" from No Angels' second album Now... Us! (2002) was re-recorded by Taiwanese girl group S.H.E for their first compilation album Together. Re-written and re-titled "Tian Shi Zai Chang Ge," it was released as a single in 2003.

Track listings

Credits and personnel
Credits adapted from the liner notes of Elle'ments.

Nadja Benaissa – vocals
Lucy Diakovska – vocals  
Sandy Mölling – vocals 

Vanessa Petruo – vocals 
Leslie Mándoki – production, drums, percussion
Jessica Wahls – vocals

Charts

Weekly charts

Year-end charts

Certifications

References

External links

2001 singles
No Angels songs
2001 songs
Polydor Records singles
Songs written by Peter Ries